Blaenau Festiniog Junction railway station (also known as Stesion Fain railway station) was the Festiniog Railway (FR)'s third of eventually five passenger stations in Blaenau Ffestiniog, then in Merionethshire, now in Gwynedd, Wales.

History
It was aimed primarily at exchange traffic with the LNWR's Conwy Valley Line station which opened a few yards away on the opposite side of North Western Road on the same day.

Naming
The station's nameboards declared the station to be Blaenau Festiniog Junction, with the anglicised single "F", but
the station was not at or near a passenger junction
locally it was known as "Stesion Fain" (Narrow Station), often misspelled as "Stesion Fein"
in FR material and Bradshaw's FR timetable it appeared as "Blaenau Festiniog (L&NW)" (i.e. connection for the LNWR)
Bradshaw's LNWR timetable mentions it only by inference by citing a page number.
One authoritative source refers to the station as "Blaenau Ffestiniog exchange" (lower case "e") whilst another uses "Blaenau Ffestiniog Exchange (LNWR)"

Interchange traffic
The FR sought to tap custom not only from Blaenau Ffestiniog itself, but also its wider connections. It co-operated with the LNWR whose southern terminus was an underarm stone's throw away on the opposite side of North Western Road. Timetabling was sympathetic; in 1910, for example, three of the FR's four non-workmen's trains from  arrived between 27 and 42 minutes before an LNWR train headed north, giving a traveller from (say)  a good chance of getting to  even if his first train was 15 minutes late. Bradshaw may have been mealy-mouthed about the proximity of the FR station, but the LNW station boasted a very large station nameboard proclaiming "BLAENAU FESTINIOG CHANGE HERE FOR NARROW GAUGE LINE TO MINFFORD AND PORTMADOC". The FR's 1936 timetable for "Tourist" trains stated they "formed suitable connections with the L.M. and S. and G.W. Coys. in both directions at Blaenau Festiniog."

Station buildings

The wilderness years
The station stood derelict for some years after closure in 1939, being progressively demolished by the elements, vandals and eventually officialdom. The water tower lived a charmed life, outliving the station buildings. The site seemed doomed when road alterations buried a stretch of the track in 1963. In 1956 the waiting shelter was dismantled and re-erected for use by spectators at Manod Football Club, though it was replaced in turn in the 2000s by a more modern structure.

For a period in the 1970s the FR locomotive "Princess" was mounted on a plinth at the station site as a symbol of remembrance and intention to return.

Modern times
The station site was a serious contender for the location of the Ffestiniog Railway's return to Blaenau, the location remained as first built, back-to-back with the ex-LNWR  which was the town's sole surviving station from 1960. The site is commemorated with a raised flowerbed.

References

Bibliography

Further reading

External links

Disused railway stations in Gwynedd
Ffestiniog Railway
Railway stations in Great Britain opened in 1881
Railway stations in Great Britain closed in 1939
1881 establishments in Wales
1939 disestablishments in Wales
Blaenau Ffestiniog